Eni S.p.A. is an Italian multinational energy company headquartered in Rome. Considered one of the seven "supermajor" oil companies in the world, it has operations in 69 countries with a market capitalization of US$54.08 billion, as of 11 April 2022. The Italian government owns a 30.33% golden share in the company, 4.37% held through the Ministry of Economy and Finance and 25.96% through the Cassa Depositi e Prestiti. The company is a component of the Euro Stoxx 50 stock market index.

The name "ENI" was initially the acronym of "Ente Nazionale Idrocarburi" (National Hydrocarbons Board). Through the years after its foundation however, it operated in many fields including contracting, nuclear power, energy, mining, chemicals and plastics, refining/extraction and distribution machinery, hospitality industry and even the textile industry and news.

With revenues around €92.2 billion, Eni ranked 111th on both the Fortune Global 500 and the Forbes Global 2000 in 2022, making it the third largest Italian company on the Fortune list (after Assicurazioni Generali and Enel) and second largest on the Forbes list (after Enel). Per the Fortune Global 500, Eni is the largest petroleum company in Italy, the second largest based in the European Union (after TotalEnergies), and the 13th largest in the world.

History

1950s–1960s

Eni was founded in 1953 from an existing company, Agip, which was created in 1926 with the aim to explore for oilfields, acquire and commercialize oil and derivatives. 
In March 1953, Enrico Mattei was nominated Eni's chairman.

Eni was originally an acronym for the company's full title Ente Nazionale Idrocarburi (National Hydrocarbons Board). 
After 1995, the meaning ceased to be relevant but the name was maintained.
In 1952, the logo of the then nascent Eni was selected. The logo is a six-legged dog, an imaginary animal symbolizing the sum of a car's four wheels and the two legs of its driver.

Starting in 1954, Eni acquired extensive exploration rights in North Africa, signing an agreement with the Egyptian government led by Nasser while providing an active and equal role for the crude producing countries through the establishment of joint ventures.
In 1957, Eni pushed for a similar agreement, known as the "Mattei formula", to be signed with Persian Shah Mohammad Reza Pahlavi and the National Iranian Oil Company.
In 1960, during the Cold War period, Eni signed an agreement with the Soviet Union for the importation of Russian crude at low prices.

On 27 October 1962, Enrico Mattei's airplane mysteriously exploded near Bascapè, on his way to Milan from Catania. 
His death was initially considered an accident, but later it was confirmed to be a murder with the aim to protect and hide important economical and political interests in Italy and especially abroad, as it is clearly stated in the records of the trial on the assassination of the journalist Mauro De Mauro, who was investigating on the death of Enrico Mattei.

During the following years, Eni signed joint venture contracts with foreign companies to supply crude from Egypt to Iran and from Libya to Tunisia.
In 1963, Eni acquired a majority stake in Italgas.

1970s–1980s
In October 1973, after the Yom Kippur War and the OPEC embargo against the United States and the Netherlands by OPEC members and Arab countries, a serious oil crisis occurred, causing Eni to consolidate its position in the international market by signing an agreement with Sonatrach, the Algerian state oil entity for natural gas supply.

In 1974, Eni signed an agreement with the Libyan government, followed by additional agreements with Egypt, Nigeria and Tunisia.

During the mid-1970s, Eni planned a major infrastructure for transporting natural gas over long distances, by building a pipeline network of thousands of miles throughout Europe and the Mediterranean.

After the inauguration of the Trans-Mediterranean Pipeline connecting Algeria to Sicily through Tunisia, Eni signs a new agreement with Libya for the exploitation of Boùri, the biggest oilfield in the centre of the Mediterranean, and develops its international role within the oil industry.

1990s–2000s
In 1992, Eni became a joint stock company by Law Decree, and was listed to the Italian and New York Stock Exchange in 1995.

From 1995 to 1998, Eni put four share offers fully successfully, as 70% of its capital assets were sold to private shareholders.

As the price of oil collapsed in 1998 as other major companies Eni got to turn into a race through merges, international acquisitions, new explorations and the foundation of real super-companies.

2000s–2010s
Since 2000, Eni has been developing the Kashagan oilfield a major offshore discovery, along the Caspian Sea.

In 2005, the Blue Stream pipeline projected to supply gas from southern Russia to Turkey was inaugurated as a joint venture between Eni and Gazprom.

In 2007, Eni signed an agreement to conduct South Stream a feasibility study with Gazprom to import Russian gas into Europe across the Black Sea.

Activist asset manager Knight Vinke, who owns 1% of the outstanding shares of the company, begun pressuring Eni's management to operate a spin-off of Eni's gas activities.
In its opinion this would solve the undervaluation of the company and release up to 50 billion euros ($70bn) of hidden value.

In 2010, Eni achieves key production milestone in Iraqi Zubair oil field.

After getting a licence in 2006 for the exploration of an offshore area in the north of Mozambique, known as Area 4, Eni announced several major natural gas discoveries between 2011 and 2012 such as Mamba South, Mamba North, Mamba North East, Coral 1.

2010 to present

In February 2014, ENI discovered oil at its DRC offshore block.

Since 2012, Eni has been selling off refining and marketing assets it owned in eastern Europe to increase profitability. By 2013 Eni already reduced its refining capacity by 13 percent. In May 2014 Eni agreed to sell their 32.5% share in Česká rafinerská a.s. (CRC), a refining company in Czech Republic, to MOL Group of Hungary.

In June 2014, the company signed an agreement with Sasol to acquire a 40% interest in a permit to explore 82,000-km2 offshore of South Africa's east coast.

In 2014, Eni launched a new plan to convert its conventional refineries into biorefineries: the first plant was in Porto Marghera, in 2019 the second one opened in Gela.

In January 2015, Eni in collaboration with Vitol Energy signed a $7 billion contract with the government of Ghana. This agreement was reached to produce oil and gas at Cape Three Points in the Western Region of Ghana, in an attempt to enable Ghana to meet its power and energy needs.

In August 2015, Eni announced the discovery of a huge gasfield off the coast of Egypt.

In 2016, Eni launched Progetto Italia, which aims to redeveloping its industrial areas and to create new renewable sources production plants: in 2018 the first photovoltaic plant was inaugurated in Assemini, the second opened in Porto Torres, both in Sardinia.

In July 2017, the oil giant accepted responsibility for an oil spill affecting the Fylde coast of Blackpool in the United Kingdom.

In January 2018, Eni launched its new HPC4 supercomputer, one of the most powerful computing systems which allows a more effective and fast exploration of oil and gas reservoirs. Since February 2020 Eni replaced the HPC4 supercomputer with the new model HPC5, which has three times the computing ability compared to the previous one.

In March 2018, Eni reached an agreement with MIT to fund fusion research projects run out of the MIT Plasma Science and Fusion Center (PSFC)’s newly created Laboratory for Innovation in Fusion Technologies (LIFT). The expected investment in these research projects will amount to about $2 million over the following years.

In March 2021, Eni exited the Pakistani market and sold its assets to Prime International Oil & Gas Company. The deal include the assets sold, interests in eight development and production leases and four exploration licences. Prime International Oil & Gas Company, a newly established joint venture (JV) between Eni Pakistan local employees and Hub Power Company.

In 2018 Eni became the first shareholder of the American company Commonwealth Fusion Systems (CFS), a spin-out of the Massachusetts Institute of Technology (MIT) in Boston. CFS aims to build a fusion reactor based on tokamak technology, much more compact and cheaper compared to other existing projects such as the international ITER. On September 5, 2021, CFS successfully built and tested a 1: 1 scale prototype of a magnet based on HTS (High Temperature Superconductors) superconductors. The experiment demonstrated for the first time that it is possible to create a fusion chamber where the confinement of the plasma is ensured by this type of super magnets. This kind of fusion chamber will allow the reactor to reach very high temperatures, above 100 million degrees, necessary to make the controlled fusion of deuterium and tritium possible and thus to produce sustainable energy. In December 2021, ENI become the first energy company in the world to highly invest in magnetic confinement nuclear fusion, through a $1.8 billion partnership in CFS, alla Ng with Google and Bill Gates.

On 17 May 2022 Eni announced the procedures for the creation of an account with Gazprombank in dual currency (euro and rubles), in order to be able to proceed with the payment of Russian gas supplies, following the unilateral amendment of the contracts ordered by the Russian Federation. The decision was taken in agreement with the Italian government and does not violate the existing sanctions. The European Commissioner for Economy Paolo Gentiloni and the competent Russian federal authorities have confirmed that payments will continue to be made in euros and that the conversion operations will be carried out by Russian clearing agents without the involvement of the Russian Central Bank.

Financial data

Operations

Exploration and production
As exploration and reserve replacement being major drivers for the company, Eni boosts for production additions in its core oil field areas (North and Sub-Saharan Africa, Venezuela, Barents Sea, Yamal Peninsula, Kazakhstan, Iraq and the Far East). Eni has about 130 exploration and production subsidiaries, such as Eni Norge. In March 2022 Eni stopped buying Russian oil because of International sanctions during the Russo-Ukrainian War.

In 2012, Eni reported liquids and gas production for the full year of 1,701 thousand barrel of oil equivalent per day (kboe/d), this being calculated assuming a natural gas conversion factor to barrel equivalent, updated to 5,492 cubic feet of gas equal 1 barrel of oil from 1 July 2012.

During 2012, 60 new exploratory wells were drilled, as 56 were drilled in 2011 and 47 in 2010. The overall commercial success rate was 40% (40.8% net to Eni) as compared to 42% in 2011 (38.6% net to Eni) and 41% in 2010 (39% net to Eni). In 2012, 351 development wells were drilled as well, as 407 in 2011 and 399 in 2010.

In 2019 Eni reported hydrocarbon production for the full year of 1,871 kboe/d.

In 2021 Eni reported hydrocarbon production for the full year of 1,68 kboe/d.

Gas and power

Natural gas
In 2012, sales of natural gas were 95.32 bcm, down 1.44 bcm compared to 2011.

In 2019 Eni reported sales of natural gas worldwide of 73.07 bcm.

In 2021 Eni reported sales of natural gas worldwide of 70.45 bcm.

Eni's power generation sites are located in Ferrera Erbognone, Ravenna, Livorno, Taranto, Mantua, Brindisi, Ferrara and Bolgiano. In 2012, Eni's power generation was 25.67 TWh.
Overall Eni supplies 2,600 customers including large companies, power generation companies, wholesalers and distributors of natural gas for automotive use. Residential users are 7.45 million and include households, professionals, small and medium size enterprises, and public bodies located all over Italy and 2.09 million customers in European Countries. International sales include Iberian Peninsula, Germany, Austria, Benelux, Hungary, UK/Northern Europe, Turkey, France markets.

Power generation
Eni's electricity generation sites in Italy, as of July 2018, are the following:
Natural gas power plants
 Bolgiano – 95 MW
 Brindisi – 1715 MW
 Ferrara – 586 MW
 Ferrera Erbognone – 1785 MW
 Mantua – 1387 MW
 Ravenna – 618 MW

Refining and marketing 
Eni is the leader operator in refining and marketing of petroleum products in Italy.
Eni is engaged in retail and wholesales activities in Central-Eastern European countries also (Austria, France, Germany, Italy, Czech Republic, Romania, Slovakia, Slovenia, Switzerland, Hungary).
Eni's market share in refining and marketing in 2019 was 23.7% in Italy, 12.3% in Austria, 7.7% in Switzerland, 3.2% in Germany and 0.6% in France. Eni also owned a 20% share of Ruwais refinery in Abu Dhabi.
Retail sales operations are conducted under the Eni and Agip brands. The re-branding of Eni's service stations in Italy and in the rest of Europe to Eni brand is underway.

Engineering and construction 
Eni operates in engineering, construction and drilling both offshore and onshore for the oil&gas industry through the subsidiary Saipem.

In April 2012, Eni in collaboration with ZEiTECS announced the world's first offshore rigless/wireline retrievable ESP system for Eni Congo.

Subsidiaries
Eni's principal subsidiaries include:

 Eni Gas & Power (100% owned) – a natural gas and power company based in Belgium formed by merger of Distrigas and Nuon Belgium
 Versalis (100% owned) – Versalis is a chemical company that manages the production and marketing of petrochemical products such as olefines, aromatics and intermediates (base chemicals), styrenes, elastomers and polyethylene, plus in recent years a focus on green chemistry, being also able to count on a range of proprietary technologies, advanced plant facilities and a broad-based distribution network.
 Saipem (30.54% owned) – Saipem is an oil and gas industry contractor. Saipem has contracted for engineering, oilfield services and construction both offshore and onshore through several pipelines, including Blue Stream, Greenstream, Nord Stream 1 and South Stream. It is a subsidiary listed on the Italian Stock Exchange.
 Eni Plenitude – marketing of natural gas and power to households and businesses, energy production from renewable sources, and charging stations for electric vehicles.
 Eni UK – carries out operations in the British section of the North Sea, in the Irish Sea and off the coast of the Shetland Islands. Has been present in UK since 1964. In 2006 Eni UK's average net production of hydrocarbons was more than 141,000 boe/d.
 Eni India – is expected to start drilling at a deepwater block 2, near Andaman and Nicobar Islands in Q2 of 2011 as it has received 2-year extension for the completion of drilling program. The program was delayed due to various environmental issues and scarcity of oil rigs. ENI India had won this block in 2005 and partners with ONGC and GAIL India.
 EniPower – generation and sale of electricity and steam technology
 EniProgetti – engineering services 
 Eni Rewind – integrated service for environmental rehabilitation
 Eni Plenitude – sale of natural gas and electricity to individuals and businesses
 Eni Next LLC – Corporate Venture Capital of Eni Group

Legal problems
The Central Energy Italian Gas Holding scandal in 2005 involved Eni and Gazprom.

In 2009, the European Commission filed formal antitrust charges against Eni. The commission believes that Eni has conspired to keep competitors from using its gas pipelines.

In 2009 again, according to the WikiLeaks cables, US ambassador Lanier told Washington that bribery allegations were made in Uganda by Eni which at the time was in competition for oil assets in the country against Tullow Oil. The bribes were taken by the newly appointed Ugandan prime minister, Amama Mbabazi.

After corruption charges against the subsidiary Saipem, Eni's CFO Alessandro Bernini had to resign and the new CFO Massimo Mondazzi took over in December 2012.

Eni and Royal Dutch Shell stood trial in Italy over allegations of corruption in the 2011 purchase of a big offshore oil field in Nigeria known as OPL 245. Eni and Shell reportedly paid $1.3 billion in bribes. On March 17, 2021, the Italian court of Milan fully acquitted Eni, its chief executive officer Claudio Descalzi and Royal Dutch Shell in the corruption trial for the Nigerian oil field OPL245. On July 19, 2022, the Attorney General waived the appeal before the Second Section of the Court of Appeal of Milan, making the acquittal sentences pronounced in March 2021 final.

Sustainability
In 2012, Eni was included in the Carbon Performance Leadership Index, which scores companies based on their commitment to transparency and environmental leadership. In the first half of 2014 Eni achieved the start-up of the Porto Torres green chemistry plant and the Venice biorefinery, with the aim to increase its production of bio and green energy. According to the 2017 Carbon Majors Report, which stores GHG emissions data on the largest company-related sources of all time, Eni accounted for 0.59% of global industrial greenhouse gas emissions from 1988 to 2015. In 2019, Eni was among the Top 10 companies by sustainability score in the World Business Council for Sustainable Development (WBCSD) rank. From 2020 to 2022, Eni is the first oil company with the most ambitious absolute emissions reduction target according to the report Absolute Impact 2022 by Carbon Tracker Initiative in accordance with the goals of the Paris agreement to significantly lower GHG emissions and increase the production of renewable energy. In 2021, Eni renewables business reached an installed capacity from renewable sources of 1,188 MW. In the same year, Eni achieved a reduction of its net Carbon Footprint Upstream by 26% compared to 2018.

Corporate structure

Board of directors
The board of directors is comprised as follows as of May 2020:

Lucia Calvosa, Chairwoman
Claudio Descalzi, CEO
Ada Lucia De Cesaris, director
Filippo Giansante, director 
Pietro Angelo Mario Antonio Guindani, director
Karina Audrey Litvack, director
Emanuele Piccinno, director 
Nathalie Tocci, director 
Raphael Louis L. Vermeir, director

See also 
 List of petroleum companies

References

Citations

General and cited sources

Further reading 

  Marcello Boldrini, Mattei, Rome, Colombo, 1969
  Marcello Colitti, Energia e sviluppo in Italia, Bari, De Donato, 1979
  Paul H. Frankel, Oil and Power Policy, New York – Washington, Praeger, 1966
  Pier Paolo Pasolini, Petrolio, various
  Nico Perrone, Enrico Mattei, Bologna, Il mulino, 2001

External links

 
 Eni from Yahoo! finance
 New Gas Routes to the European Union

 
Oil and gas companies of Italy
Automotive fuel retailers
Chemical companies of Italy
Multinational oil companies
Multinational companies headquartered in Italy
Italy
Government-owned companies of Italy
Partly privatized companies of Italy
Conglomerate companies of Italy
Companies based in Rome
Energy companies established in 1953
Non-renewable resource companies established in 1953
Companies in the Euro Stoxx 50
Companies listed on the Borsa Italiana
Italian brands
Italian companies established in 1953
1995 initial public offerings